"The Gift" is the first single released from Australian rock band INXS's 1993 album, Full Moon, Dirty Hearts. The song was written by Jon Farriss and Michael Hutchence. Upon its release, it reached number two in Portugal, number six on the US Billboard Album Rock Tracks chart, and number 16 in Australia. The music video was banned by MTV due to featuring controversial content.

Music video
The music video for "The Gift" dramatises issues ranging from war and terrorism to famine and pollution with the band appearing to crash through the TV screen in anger. The video was banned by MTV owing to its use of Holocaust and Gulf War footage.

In an interview with the director and long-term collaborator Richard Lowenstein: "The video uses harrowing visuals in order to portray man's ability to create havoc and destruction. The message behind the video is to show how as viewers, we have become accepting of, and increasingly apathetic to images of gross human suffering and violence."

B-sides
The B-sides on the first of two UK CD Single releases include two remixes of "The Gift", a live version of "Heaven Sent", and a cover of Steppenwolf's "Born to Be Wild", which was specially recorded for the April 1993 launch of Virgin Radio in the UK.

Track listings
CD single 1 (INXCD25)
 The Gift
 The Gift (Bonus Beats Mix)
 Born to Be Wild

CD single 2 (INXCT 25)
 The Gift
 The Gift (Extended Mix)
 Heaven Sent (Live)

CD single 3 (Atlantic 85722-2)
 The Gift
 Born to Be Wild
 The Gift (Extended Mix)
 The Gift (Bonus Beat Mix)
 Heaven Sent (Live)

7-inch vinyl and cassette single (INXS25)
 The Gift
 The Gift (Extended Mix)

Charts

Release history

References

1993 singles
1993 songs
Atlantic Records singles
East West Records singles
INXS songs
Mercury Records singles
Music video controversies
Song recordings produced by Mark Opitz
Songs written by Andrew Farriss
Songs written by Michael Hutchence